Hosne Ara Putul (also spelled as Hosneara Putul) is a Bangladeshi actress and model. Putul is the recipient of several accolades, including National Film Awards in 1994.

Career
In 2004 she appeared in the film Shyamol Chhaya, which was Bangladesh's submission to the 78th Academy Awards in the 'Foreign Language Film' category. Beginning in 2014, she appeared in the film Jonakir Aalo, which was selected as the Bangladeshi entry for the Best Foreign Language Film at the 87th Academy Awards, but was not nominated.

Filmography

Television series
 Kothao Keu Nei (1990)
 Grihosukh Private Limited (1998)
 Vober Hat (2006) as Khushboo
 14 Inch-e Shada Kalo Rongin Television

Awards

References

External links

Hosne Ara Putul at Filmow

Living people
Bangladeshi film actresses
Bangladeshi television actresses
Bangladeshi female models
Recipients of the National Film Awards (Bangladesh)
Year of birth missing (living people)